Pay Without Performance: The Unfulfilled Promise of Executive Compensation is a 2004 book by professors of law Lucian Bebchuk and Jesse Fried on the power of corporate executives in the United States to influence their own pay and of the structural defects in corporate governance that grant them this power.

The book has been praised by mutual fund founder John C. Bogle, Nobel Laureate in Economics Joseph Stiglitz, The Washington Post, and others.

References

External links
 Book introduction
 Google Books

2004 non-fiction books
Business books
Employment in the United States
Executive compensation
Harvard University Press books